The Trade Tower in Gangnam district, Seoul, is one of South Korea's tallest buildings, part of the World Trade Center Seoul. The 54-floor Trade Tower high-rise was built in 1988 and stands at 748 feet (228 m). It resembles two quadro-level towers in mirror image of each other. It is part of the COEX complex. Its 52nd floor hosts a restaurant.

Pop culture
Thirty-one seconds into the Gangnam Style music video, the Tower can be seen in the background while Psy is doing his horse-riding dance on the top of ASEM Tower. It can be seen again from far away 1:28 into the video.

See also
List of tallest buildings in Seoul
List of tallest buildings in South Korea

References

External links
 

Buildings and structures in Gangnam District
Skyscraper office buildings in Seoul
World Trade Center Seoul
Office buildings completed in 1988
1988 establishments in South Korea
20th-century architecture in South Korea